Write It on Your Skin is the third album by British singer-songwriter Newton Faulkner. It was released on 9 July 2012. The title track "Write It on Your Skin" was released as the first single from the album, shortly followed by "Clouds".

Reviews

The BBC gave a generally positive review of the album, describing it as "a late-night cocoa after a long day" - neither shocking nor amazing. Pick Up Your Broken Heart was felt to be inferior to similar heartbreak-oriented songs while Longshot was positively reviewed as a simple yet bullishly focused song.

MusicOMH gave a mixed review of 2.5 stars, indicating that while the album had excellent lyrics and vocals, it also lacked any substantive change in nature from Faulkner's previous albums.

Production
Newton Faulkner described the process of this album as "very different to the other two", which was one of the reasons for changing the naming of this album, not fitting with the same tone as the others. He had written it to play live as opposed to be recorded and, as such, is more upbeat and positive than the others. "Pick Up Your Broken Heart" was written on a boat, in sessions with David Sneddon and James Bauer-Mein (The Nexus) and "Soon" was developed with Thomas Leeb. Another album collaborator was bass player Sam Farrar.

Track listing

References

2012 albums
Newton Faulkner albums